GhanaPostGPS is a web and smartphone application, sponsored by the government of Ghana and developed by Vokacom, to provide a digital addresses and postal codes for every 5 squared meter location in Ghana. The digital address is a composite of the postcode (region, district & area code) plus a unique address.

A mandatory requirement in trying to obtain the National Identification Card and other services, GhanaPostGPS is the first digital addressing system created by the government of Ghana.

See also
Postal codes in Ghana

References

External links
Regional and District Postal Codes in Ghana

Application software